Justice Sabihuddin Ahmed (1949–2009) was a former Chief Justice of the Sindh High Court and a justice of the Supreme Court of Pakistan.

Early life and education
Ahmed was born in Hyderabad, Sindh in 1949 to senior civil officer Wajihuddin Ahmed and Atiya Bano. He was the oldest of five siblings, following him were Mehrunissa Ahmad Ali, Aminuddin Ahmed, Lalarukh Jamil and Nooruddin Ahmed. He passed his MA from the University of Punjab, Lahore in 1969 and his LLB from the University of Karachi.

Family
He is survived by his wife Nelofer Ahmed, daughter and journalist Sanaa Ahmed, son and barrister Salahuddin Ahmed and son Rameezuddin Ahmed, who is currently pursuing his undergraduate degree from Canada. His grandfather was Maulana Salahuddin Ahmed, a prolific Urdu writer and editor of the Urdu literary magazine Adabi Dunya. Amongst his cousins are the human rights activists and sisters, Hina Jilani and Asma Jehangir, business leader Iqbal Z. Ahmed, thespian Salima Raza and also activist Nigar Ahmad. His son Salahuddin is a partner in Munir A. Malik's law firm, the same law firm Sabihuddin was a partner of before he became a judge.

Career
He joined the profession in 1972, working under his maternal uncle Khalid M. Ishaq. He was a founder member of the Human Rights Commission of Pakistan (HRCP) and its first vice chairperson for Sindh.

Judge

Sindh High Court
Ahmed was elevated to the bench on 11 January 1997. He resigned from the HRCP at that time. During the same year, he gave a landmark judgement regarding monetary compensation to a detenu in a habeas corpus petition.

Supreme Court of Pakistan
He was elevated to the Supreme Court during the regime of President Pervez Musharraf but refused to take oath under the Provisional Constitutional Order (PCO). Once a democratic government was restored, he took the oath and served from September 19, 2008, until his death on April 18, 2009.

Death
He died of a brain hemorrhage on 19 April 2009 in Karachi.

References

1949 births
2009 deaths
Pakistani judges
20th-century Pakistani lawyers
Chief Justices of the Sindh High Court
Justices of the Supreme Court of Pakistan